Attila Polonkai (born 12 June 1979) is a Hungarian football player.

External links
 Profile
 
 

1979 births
Living people
Footballers from Budapest
Hungarian footballers
Association football midfielders
Hungary international footballers
Budapesti VSC footballers
Szeged LC footballers
Szolnoki MÁV FC footballers
Vasas SC players
Újpest FC players
Rákospalotai EAC footballers
Fehérvár FC players
Puskás Akadémia FC players
Nemzeti Bajnokság I players